The Zavolzhsky Constituency (No. 180) is a Russian legislative constituency in the Tver Oblast. In 1993-2007 most of the constituency was included into the old Tver constituency, but in 2016 Bezhetsk constituency was extended to Tver and gained the name "Tver constituency", while mostly rural parts of former Tver constituency were placed into new Zavolzhsky constituency.

Members elected

Election results

2016

|-
! colspan=2 style="background-color:#E9E9E9;text-align:left;vertical-align:top;" |Candidate
! style="background-color:#E9E9E9;text-align:left;vertical-align:top;" |Party
! style="background-color:#E9E9E9;text-align:right;" |Votes
! style="background-color:#E9E9E9;text-align:right;" |%
|-
|style="background-color: " |
|align=left|Vladimir Vasilyev
|align=left|United Russia
|125,812
|53.03%
|-
|style="background-color: " |
|align=left|Artyom Goncharov
|align=left|Communist Party
|34,052
|14.35%
|-
|style="background-color: " |
|align=left|Vladimir Barastov
|align=left|Liberal Democratic Party
|25,594
|10.79%
|-
|style="background-color: " |
|align=left|Timur Kanokov
|align=left|A Just Russia
|15,254
|6.43%
|-
|style="background-color: " |
|align=left|Marina Belova
|align=left|People's Freedom Party
|10,650
|4.49%
|-
|style="background-color: " |
|align=left|Aleksandr Sorokin
|align=left|Yabloko
|7,314
|3.08%
|-
|style="background-color: " | 
|align=left|Dmitry Slitinsky
|align=left|Communists of Russia
|12,938
|2.87%
|-
|style="background: #00A86B;"| 
|align=left|Vadim Shklyar
|align=left|Civilian Power
|2,068
|0.87%
|-
|style="background-color: " |
|align=left|Roman Komarnitsky
|align=left|Civic Platform
|1,755
|0.74%
|-
| colspan="5" style="background-color:#E9E9E9;"|
|- style="font-weight:bold"
| colspan="3" style="text-align:left;" | Total
| 
| 100%
|-
| colspan="5" style="background-color:#E9E9E9;"|
|- style="font-weight:bold"
| colspan="4" |Source:
|
|}

2018

|-
! colspan=2 style="background-color:#E9E9E9;text-align:left;vertical-align:top;" |Candidate
! style="background-color:#E9E9E9;text-align:left;vertical-align:top;" |Party
! style="background-color:#E9E9E9;text-align:right;" |Votes
! style="background-color:#E9E9E9;text-align:right;" |%
|-
|style="background-color: " |
|align=left|Sergey Veremeenko
|align=left|United Russia
|47,263
|36.21%
|-
|style="background-color: " |
|align=left|Vadim Solovyov
|align=left|Communist Party
|27,177
|20.82%
|-
|style="background-color: " |
|align=left|Leonid Bulatov
|align=left|Liberal Democratic Party
|15,706
|12.03%
|-
|style="background-color: " |
|align=left|Sergey Yurovsky
|align=left|A Just Russia
|13,521
|10.36%
|-
|style="background-color: " |
|align=left|Aleksandr Grishin
|align=left|Party of Pensioners
|11,620
|8.90%
|-
|style="background-color: " |
|align=left|Ilya Kleymyonov
|align=left|Communists of Russia
|9,301
|7.13%
|-
| colspan="5" style="background-color:#E9E9E9;"|
|- style="font-weight:bold"
| colspan="3" style="text-align:left;" | Total
| 130,523
| 100%
|-
| colspan="5" style="background-color:#E9E9E9;"|
|- style="font-weight:bold"
| colspan="4" |Source:
|
|}

2021

|-
! colspan=2 style="background-color:#E9E9E9;text-align:left;vertical-align:top;" |Candidate
! style="background-color:#E9E9E9;text-align:left;vertical-align:top;" |Party
! style="background-color:#E9E9E9;text-align:right;" |Votes
! style="background-color:#E9E9E9;text-align:right;" |%
|-
|style="background-color: " |
|align=left|Vladimir Vasilyev
|align=left|United Russia
|95,565
|42.14%
|-
|style="background-color: " |
|align=left|Artyom Goncharov
|align=left|Communist Party
|45,135
|19.90%
|-
|style="background-color: " |
|align=left|Dmitry Ignatkov
|align=left|A Just Russia — For Truth
|19,882
|8.77%
|-
|style="background-color: " |
|align=left|Leonid Bulatov
|align=left|Liberal Democratic Party
|17,603
|7.76%
|-
|style="background-color: " |
|align=left|Aleksandr Grishin
|align=left|Party of Pensioners
|13,660
|6.02%
|-
|style="background-color: " |
|align=left|Dmitry Slitinsky
|align=left|Communists of Russia
|10,226
|4.51%
|-
|style="background-color: " |
|align=left|Aleksandr Sorokin
|align=left|Yabloko
|8,152
|3.59%
|-
|style="background-color: " |
|align=left|Pavel Sobolev
|align=left|Russian Party of Freedom and Justice
|5,667
|2.50%
|-
| colspan="5" style="background-color:#E9E9E9;"|
|- style="font-weight:bold"
| colspan="3" style="text-align:left;" | Total
| 226,794
| 100%
|-
| colspan="5" style="background-color:#E9E9E9;"|
|- style="font-weight:bold"
| colspan="4" |Source:
|
|}

Sources
180. Заволжский одномандатный избирательный округ

Notes

References

Russian legislative constituencies
Politics of Tver Oblast